Belle Plaine is a city in Scott County, Minnesota, United States, about 40 minutes southwest of Minneapolis. The population was 7,395 at the 2020 census.

History
Minnesota Territorial Supreme Court Judge Andrew G. Chatfield selected the townsite of Belle Plaine in 1853 while traveling from Mendota to Traverse des Sioux to hold court, as it was a halfway marker on his usual path of travel. Judge Chatfield chose to name the townsite Belle Plaine, which is French for "Beautiful Prairie."

From 1868 to 1974, Belle Plaine was incorporated as a borough, the only one in Minnesota. In 1974, it became a city.

In 1870, the Minnesota State Legislature passed "An act to aid in the development of the salt springs at Belle Plaine", which donated six pieces of state-owned salt land to a holding company under certain conditions, notably that a well was to be drilled at Belle Plaine. The public funds put the company under great public scrutiny. A year later "An act to further aid the Belle Plaine Salt Company in the development of Salt Springs at Belle Plaine" passed.

Geography

U.S. Highway 169 and Minnesota State Highway 25 are two of the main routes in the community. The U.S. Highway 169 corridor travels from the city of Virginia along the western edge of Mille Lacs Lake, through the western suburbs of Minneapolis and continues south through Belle Plaine, Mankato, and then into Iowa. It is a central route of travel and provides easy access to the Twin Cities and southern Minnesota.

Belle Plaine is located along the Minnesota River, which flows northeast through the town. A fairly newly constructed bridge crosses on the north side of town via Minnesota State Highway 25.

Belle Plaine is located within the Minnesota River Valley, an area of considerable width in which a great river once ran after the receding of the glaciers that left Minnesota with so many lakes. The ancient river's banks are discernible as the slopes of the valley rise up on either side of the town.

Demographics

2010 census
As of the census of 2010, there were 6,661 people, 2,362 households, and 1,680 families living in the city. The city's racial makeup was 94.2% White, 1.1% African American, 0.2% Native American, 1.4% Asian, 1.2% from other races, and 1.8% from two or more races. Hispanic or Latino of any race were 2.1% of the population.

There were 2,362 households, of which 43.6% had children under the age of 18 living with them, 56.9% were married couples living together, 8.5% had a female householder with no husband present, 5.8% had a male householder with no wife present, and 28.9% were non-families. 22.2% of all households were made up of individuals, and 7.7% had someone living alone who was 65 years of age or older. The average household size was 2.73 and the average family size was 3.22.

The median age in the city was 32.5 years. 30% of residents were under the age of 18; 6.2% were between the ages of 18 and 24; 34.1% were from 25 to 44; 18.8% were from 45 to 64; and 10.9% were 65 years of age or older. The gender makeup of the city was 49.6% male and 50.4% female.

2000 census
As of the census of 2000, there were 3,789 people, 1,396 homes and 949 families living in the city. The city's racial makeup was 97.39% White, 0.13% African American, 0.40% Native American, 0.71% Asian, 0.45% from other races, and 0.92% from two or more races. Hispanic or Latino of any race were 1.13% of the population.

There were 1,396 households, of which 38.6% had children, 53.4% were married couples living together, 10.0% had a female householder with no husband present. 26.0% of all households were made up of individuals, and 11.5% had someone living alone who was 65 years of age or older. The average household size was 2.59 and the average family size was 3.13.

In the city, the population was spread out, with 28.1% under the age of 18, 7.3% from 18 to 24, 31.3% from 25 to 44, 17.1% from 45 to 64, and 16.2% who were 65 years of age or older. The median age was 35 years. For every 100 females, there were 97.8 males. For every 100 females age 18 and over, there were 93.1 males.

Education
Belle Plaine Public Schools are part of the Belle Plaine Public School District. The district educates nearly 1500 students in grades Kindergarten through 12. There are two elementary schools, with Chatfield Elementary holding preschool and kindergarten through second grade, and Oakcrest Elementary holding third through sixth grade. Seventh through 12th grades are held in Belle Plaine Junior/Senior High School. Graduating classes from BPHS usually range from 100 to 120 students.

Trinity Lutheran School is a Pre-K-8 grade school of the Wisconsin Evangelical Lutheran Synod in Belle Plaine.

Notable people
 Beth Riesgraf, television actress
 Ryan Dungey, four-time AMA Supercross and four-time AMA Motocross Champion
 Arthur A. Hahn, Minnesota state senator and businessman
 Peter Roy, Minnesota state and territorial legislator and farmer

References

External links
City of Belle Plaine Minnesota – Official City Website
Belle Plaine Public Schools – website
ePodunk: Profile for Belle Plaine, Minnesota
List of Belle Plaine Businesses
Our Lady of the Prairie Catholic Church and School

Cities in Minnesota
Cities in Scott County, Minnesota
Boroughs of the United States